Doroneuria is a genus of common stoneflies in the family Perlidae. There are at least two described species in Doroneuria.

Species
These two species belong to the genus Doroneuria:
 Doroneuria baumanni Stark & Gaufin, 1974 (cascades stone)
 Doroneuria theodora (Needham & Claassen, 1922)

References

Further reading

 
 

Perlidae
Articles created by Qbugbot